5-Methylsalicylic acid is an organic compound with the formula CH3C6H3(CO2H)(OH). It is a white solid that is soluble in basic water and in polar organic solvents. At neutral pH, the acid exists as 5-methylsalicylate  Its functional groups include a carboxylic acid and a phenol group. It is one of four isomers of methylsalicylic acid.

It can be prepared by hydroxylation of 3-methylbenzoic acid.

See also
 3-Methylsalicylic acid
 4-Methylsalicylic acid
 6-Methylsalicylic acid

References 

Salicylic acids